Aristobulus or Aristoboulos may refer to:

Aristobulus I (died 103 BC), king of the Hebrew Hasmonean Dynasty, 104–103 BC
Aristobulus II (died 49 BC), king of Judea from the Hasmonean Dynasty, 67–63 BC
Aristobulus III of Judea (53 BC–36 BC), last scion of the Hasmonean royal house
Aristobulus IV (31 BC–7 BC), Prince of Judea, son of Herod the Great and Mariamne, married Berenice, father of Agrippa I
Aristobulus Minor, son of the above, brother of Agrippa I
Aristobulus of Chalcis
Aristobulus of Alexandria (c. 160 BC), Hellenistic Jewish philosopher
Aristobulus of Cassandreia (375 BC–301 BC), Greek historian and engineer, accompanied Alexander the Great on his campaigns
Aristobulus of Britannia, one of the Seventy Disciples, brother of Barnabas
Aristobulus of Alexandria, one of 72 priests who translated the Torah into the Greek
Aristobulus, brother to the philosopher Epicurus, and the eponymous subject of one of his works
Aristobulus, a painter referred to by Pliny with the epithet "Syrus" (which the scholar Karl Julius Sillig understood to indicate his origin on the island of Syros), about whom little else is known